The abbreviation TTI can refer to:

 Techtronic Industries, a Hong Kong electrical company
 Texas A&M Transportation Institute, a research agency
 Texas Tennessee Industries, now Igloo Products Corporation
 Transmission Time Interval in digital telecommunication
 Toyota Technological Institute, Japan
 Toyota Technological Institute at Chicago or TTI-Chicago
 TTI, Inc., a distributor of electronics components
 A belt worn with a martial arts dobok
 TTI Telecom, an Operations Support Systems vendor
 Transfusion transmitted infection
 Time temperature indicator of the history of a perishable product
 Travel Technology Interactive, airline software company
 Turbo Technologies Inc., video game and console-making subsidiary of NEC.
 Troubled teen industry
 Text-to-image model in machine learning